The 13th Screen Awards also The Hero Honda 13th Annual Star Screen Awards ceremony, presented by Indian Express Group, honored the best Indian Hindi-language films of 2006. The ceremony was held on 6 January 2007 at Bandra Kurla Complex Ground, Mumbai, hosted by Raju Srivastav and Navin Prabhakar. And it was telecasted on 14 January 2007, StarPlus.

Omkara and Rang De Basanti led the ceremony with 18 nominations each, followed by Gangster and Lage Raho Munnabhai with 10 nominations each and Kabhi Alvida Naa Kehna with 8 nominations.

Rang De Basanti won 8 awards, including Best Director (for Rakeysh Omprakash Mehra) and Best Supporting Actress (for Kirron Kher), thus becoming the most-awarded film at the ceremony.

Awards
The winners and nominees have been listed below. Winners are listed first, highlighted in boldface, and indicated with a double dagger.

Main Awards

Technical Awards

Critics' Awards

Special awards

Superlatives

References

External links
 The Screen Awards (2007) at the Internet Movie Database

Screen Awards